Norlington may refer to:

Norlington, East Sussex, a hamlet in Ringmer parish, England
Norlington School, a school in London, England